Tetragonoderus luridus is a species of beetle in the family Carabidae. It was described by Quedenfeldt in 1883.

References

luridus
Beetles described in 1883